Overbore cartridges are those with a relatively large case volume or case capacity, coupled with a relatively small diameter bullet.

The case volume or case capacity and barrel bore area can be mathematically related to obtain a case volume to bore area ratio in metric or imperial units.

where:
  = the cartridge case internal volume or case capacity (in ml or (for non-metric users) grains of water)
  = barrel bore cross section area (in cm2 or in2)

The higher the Oratio result, the more overbore a cartridge will be. As the ratio is expressed in units of length, relatively high Oratio is a good predictor of suitability for relatively long barreled guns.

Oratio is also used to predict barrel life in cartridges of the same caliber, but not of different calibres, since the ratio is an extensive quantity that does not correlate to temperature or pressure (e.g. a .50 cal straight cartridge may have the same overbore as a highly necked down .17 cal cartridge).

Comparative index for various rifle cartridges

The bore cross section areas "Q" used in the calculations were taken from the appropriate C.I.P. data sheets.

The intermediate cartridges .30 Carbine, 7.92×33mm Kurz, 7.62×39mm, 7.62×45mm, 5.45×39mm, .223 Remington/5.56×45mm NATO and 5.8×42mm stand out as having relatively low sub 8 Oratio's.

References
 “Overbore” Cartridges Defined by Formula Can a Formula Provide a Useful Index Ranking of Overbore Cartridges? http://www.accurateshooter.com

Firearms
Firearm terminology
Ammunition
Ballistics